The Rigault-Deproux RD-3 was a tourism gyroplane built by the French company Rigault-Deproux in the 1960s.

Design
The RD-3 was a two-seat design powered by a  Potez 4E-20 4-cylinder air-cooled horizontally-opposed piston engine.

References

Further reading
 
 

Single-engined pusher autogyros
Aircraft first flown in 1966
1960s French aircraft